Désiré Mbonabucya (born 25 February 1977) is a Rwandan former professional footballer who played as a forward.

Club career 
Mbonabucya was born in Kigali, Rwanda. He was considered a valuable goalscorer for Sint-Truidense V.V. during his time at the club. After an injury, Mbonabucya moved to KVK Tienen. On 20 February 2009, he signed for US Albert in Schaerbeek. and eighteen months contract.

International career 
Along with teammate Claude Kalisa, Mbonabucya formed the backbone of the Rwandan national team that participated in the 2004 African Nations Cup.

Coaching career 
Mbonabucya began his coaching career on 20 February 2009 as youth head coach for US Albert in Schaerbaek.

References

External links 
 
 
 

Living people
1977 births
People from Kigali
Association football forwards
Rwandan footballers
Rwanda international footballers
2004 African Cup of Nations players
Belgian Pro League players
Challenger Pro League players
Süper Lig players
Rayon Sports F.C. players
K.V. Mechelen players
Gaziantepspor footballers
Sint-Truidense V.V. players
K.V.K. Tienen-Hageland players
Rwandan expatriate footballers
Rwandan expatriate sportspeople in Turkey
Expatriate footballers in Turkey
Rwandan expatriate sportspeople in Belgium
Expatriate footballers in Belgium